Second Presbyterian Church is a historic Presbyterian church located at 419 W. Washington St., Petersburg, Virginia. It was designed by architect and church pastor Theodorick Pryor and was built in 1861–1862, in the Gothic Revival style. It has stucco covered brick walls and a tower that protrudes from the central bay of its three-bay entry facade. The interior features iron ornamentation, cast by a foundry in Petersburg at the beginning of the American Civil War.

It was listed on the National Register of Historic Places in 1991.  It is located in the Folly Castle Historic District.

References

External links
Second Presbyterian Church website

19th-century Presbyterian church buildings in the United States
Presbyterian churches in Virginia
Churches on the National Register of Historic Places in Virginia
Gothic Revival church buildings in Virginia
Churches completed in 1862
Buildings and structures in Petersburg, Virginia
National Register of Historic Places in Petersburg, Virginia
Individually listed contributing properties to historic districts on the National Register in Virginia
1862 establishments in Virginia